The Lake Kutubu rainbowfish (Melanotaenia lacustris) is a species of fish in the family Melanotaeniidae. It is also known as turquoise rainbowfish. It is one of 13
fish endemic to Lake Kutubu, a lake found within the Kikori River system in Papua New Guinea.<ref></ref</ref>

Sources

Melanotaenia
Freshwater fish of Papua New Guinea
Fish described in 1964
Taxonomy articles created by Polbot